Tariq Javed (born June 12, 1949) is a former cricketer. He played three One Day Internationals for Canada.

He graduated with a B. Com from Karachi University (St. Patrick's College) in 1967. Obtained a CA degree from the Canadian Institute of Chartered Accountants in 1972 and has worked with Ernst & Young for 9 years and then as a Director-General with Auditor General of Canada until 1986 and since then has been a senior advisor with Saudi Arabian Monetary Agency.

References

External links

1949 births
Living people
Canadian cricketers
Canada One Day International cricketers
Pakistani emigrants to Canada
Naturalized citizens of Canada
Karachi Education Board cricketers
Karachi University cricketers
Karachi Whites cricketers
Pakistani cricketers
Canadian sportspeople of Pakistani descent
St. Patrick's College (Karachi) alumni
University of Karachi alumni